The Milroy Lectures are given on topics in public health, to the Royal College of Physicians, London. They were set up by money left by Gavin Milroy, who died in 1886.

List of lectures

To 1900
1888 Robert Lawson, Epidemic Influences
1889 John Thomas Arlidge, Hygiene, Diseases and Mortality of Occupations
1890 Arthur Ransome, The Causes and Prevention of Phthisis
1891 Sir Richard Thorne, Diphtheria: Its Natural History and Prevention
1892 Francis Warner, On an Inquiry as to the Physical and Mental Condition of School Children
1893 Arthur Whitelegge, On Changes of Type in Epidemic Diseases
1894 John Berry Haycraft, Darwinism and Race Progress
1895 Arthur Newsholme, The Natural History and Affinities of Rheumatic Fever
1896 Edward Cox Seaton, The Value of Isolation and its Difficulties
1897 William Collingridge, On Quarantine
1898 Sydney Arthur Monckton Copeman, On the Natural History of Vaccinia, book versionVaccination, Its Natural History and Pathology
1899 George Vivian Poore, The Earth in Relation to the Destruction and Preservation of Contagia
1900 Frederick Joseph Waldo, Summer Diarrhœa, with Special Regard to Causation and Prevention

1901 to 1950
1901 John Frederick J. Sykes, On The Influence of the Dwelling upon Health
1902 William Henry Corfield, On the Etiology of Typhoid Fever and its Prevention
1903 Herbert Timbrell Bulstrode, On the Causes, Prevalence and Control of Pulmonary Tuberculosis
1904 William Williams, On Deaths in Childbed: A Preventable Mortality
1905 Thomas Morison Legge, On Industrial Anthrax
1906 William Heaton Hamer, Epidemic Disease in England: The Evidence of Variability and of Persistency of Type
1907 Leonard Rogers, On Kāla-azār
1908 John William Henry Eyre, On melitensis septicaemia (Malta or Mediterranean Fever)
1909 Richard Tanner Hewlett, On Disinfection and Disinfectants
1910 Alexander Grant Russell Foulerton, The Streptotrichoses and Tuberculosis
1911 Arthur Edwin Boycott, On Ankylostoma infection
1912 Francis Arthur Bainbridge, On Paratyphoid Fever and Meat Poisoning
1913 Robert McCarrison, On the Etiology of Endemic Goitre
1914 Frank Shufflebotham, On the Hygienic Aspects of the Coal-Mining Industry in the United Kingdom
1915 Edgar Leigh Collis, Industrial pneumonoconioses with special reference to dust phthisis, published 1919
1916 Samson George Moore, Infantile Mortality and the Relative Practical Value of Measures Directed to Its Prevention
1917 William James Howarth, Meat inspection: with special reference to the developments of recent years
1918 Henry Richard Kenwood, On the Teaching and Training in Hygiene: Some Criticisms and Suggestions 
1919 John Christie McVail, Half a Century of Small-pox and Vaccination
1920 Aldo Castellani, The higher Fungi in relation to Human Pathology
1921 Martin Flack, On Respiratory Efficiency in Relation to Health and Disease
1922 Major Greenwood, on the Influence of Industrial Employment upon General Health
1923 William George Savage, Canned Foods in Relation to Health1924 William Glen Liston, Epidemiology of Plague 
1925 Arthur Salusbury MacNalty, On Epidemic Diseases of the Central Nervous System 
1926 William Whiteman Carlton Topley, Experimental Epidemiology in Mice1927 William Francis Dearden, Health Hazards in the Cotton Industry1928 Francis Albert Eley Crew, Genetical Aspects of Natural Immunity and Disease Resistance 
1929 James Graham Forbes, Diphtheria Immunisation1930 James Alison Glover, On the Incidence of Rheumatic Diseases1931 Sheldon Francis Dudley, On Lessons on Infectious Diseases in The Royal Navy1932 Charles Cyril Okell, On haemolytic streptococci1933 Robert Cruickshank, on Pneumococcal infections 
1934 George Seaton Buchanan, International co-operation in public health1935 Eric Henry Rhys Harries, Infection and its Control in Children's Wards1936 Edward Loggie Middleton, Industrial Pilmonary Disease due to the Inhalation of Dust1937 Philip Montague D'Arcy Hart, prevention of pulmonary tuberculosis among adults in England 
1938 Bernard Edward Schlesinger, Public Health Aspect of Heart Disease in Childhood 
1939 Donald Stewart, Industrial Medical Services In Great Britain: A Critical Survey  
1940 Ronald Edward Smith
1941 Norman Brandon Capon
1942 William Norman Pickles, Epidemic Diseases in Village Life in Peace and War1943 Sydney Alexander Henry
1944 Arthur Harold Gale, A Century of Changes in the Mortality and Incidence of the Principal Infections which Cause Death or Disability in Childhood1945 Henry Stanley Banks, Meningococcosis: a protean disease1946 Hugh Edward Magee, Application of Nutrition to Public Health 
1947 Ronald Epey Lane, The care of the lead worker1948 Graham Selby Wilson, The Public Health laboratory Service 
1949 Marc Daniels, Tuberculosis in post-war Europe 
1950 Weldon Dalrymple-Champneys, Undulant fever, a neglected problem1951 to 2000
1951 John Constable Broom, Leptospirosis 
1952 Victor Henry Springett, An interpretation of statistical trends in tuberculosis 
1953 W. Richard S. Doll, Bronchial carcinoma, incidence and aetiology 
1954 D.A. Long, The pathogenesis of Rheumatic Fever1955 James A. Smiley, Personal factors in accident proneness 
1956 Richard Selwyn Francis Schilling, Chronic respiratory disease amongst cotton and other textile workers 
1957 D.D. Reid, Environmental factors in respiratory disease 
1958 Cecily D. Williams, Social medicine in developing countries 
1959 Albert Ray Southwood, Aspects of Preventive Cardiology1960 Leslie George Norman, The Medical Aspects of the Prevention of Road Accidents1961 Henry George Miller, Accident neurosis 
1962 R.F.L. Logan, The quality of medical care 
1963 Andrew Meiklejohn, The Successful Prevention of Lead Poisoning and Silicosis in the North Staffordshire Potteries1964 Alick John Robertson, Tin Mining1965 William Ivor Neil Kessel, Self-poisoning1966 Daniel Thomson, Mass immunization in the control of infectious diseases1967 Leon Golberg, Topics pertaining to the amelioration of food 
1968? Arthur Salusbury MacNalty, The Prevention of Smallpox1968 P. Henderson, The changing pattern of disease and disability in schoolchildren 
1969 Kenneth Sunderland Holt, The Quality of Survival1970 W.R. Thrower, Agriculture and the public health1971 Richard de Alarcon, Drug Abuse as a Communicable Disease 
1972 A. Gerald Shaper, Cardiovascular Disease in the Tropics1973 D.J. Bauer, Antiviral Chemotherapy-the first decade 
1974 Julian Tudor Hart, The marriage of primary care and epidemiology1975 John Lorber, The history of the management of myelomeningocele and hydrocephalus1976 John Pemberton, Some failures of modern medicine1977 John Peel Sparks, Recent experience of influenza1978 Bertram Mann, Pulmonary asbestosis with special reference to an epidemic at Hebden Bridge1979 Frederic Stanley William Brimblecombe, A new approach to the care of handicapped children1980  David Henry Morgan Woollam, Teratogens in everyday life1981  R. V. H. Jones, Privacy and the public health1983  A. J. Buller, Research in and for the NHS1984  Adetokunbo Oluwole O. Lucas, The persistent challenge of malaria and other tropical infections1985  P. S. Harper, The prevention of Huntingdon's chorea: a study in genetics and epidemiology1986  A. Young, The cachexia of old age1987  R. Goulding, Poisoning as a social phenomenon1988  J.E. Cotes,  Occupational health today and tomorrow: a view from two shipyards1989  R. Harris, The new genetics: a challenge to traditional medicine1990  Clifford F. Hawkins, Audit of medico‐legal actions arising in the NHS1992  Richard J. Lilford, Logic versus intuition in medical decision making1993  Ian M. Leck, Clinical and public health ethics‐conflicting or complementary?1994  S. Ebrahim, Public health implications of ageing1995  Zarrina Kurtz, Do children's rights to health care in the UK ensure their best interests?1997  Joe Collier, Rationalising state spending on medicines1998  Graham C.M. Watt, Not only scientists but also responsible citizens2000  John Ashton, State medicine and public hygiene ‐ implications of the new public healthFrom 2001
2001 Peter Elwood, Aspirin: past, present and future2002 Gabriel J. Scally, "The very pests of society" – the Irish and 150 years of public health in England2003 Graham Winyard, Doctors, managers and politicians  
2004 Rajan Madhok, Doctors in the new millennium: Hippocrates or Hypocrites?; M. W. Adler, Sex is dangerous!2005 C. M. McKee, Winners and losers: the health effects of political transition in Eastern Europe   
2006 J. R. Britton, Smoking: the biggest challenge to public health2007 P. Tyrer,  Personality disorder and public mental health2008 R. Zimmern, Testing challenges: the evaluation of novel diagnostics and biomarkers2009 C. Law, Will our children be healthy adults?2010 P. Easterbrook, Universal access to antiretroviral therapy by 2010: responding to the challenge2011 S. Griffiths, Promoting the public's health: lessons from east and west2012 Gareth Williams, Flat learning curve: why the anti-vaccination movement has survived into the 21st century 
2014 Chris Whitty, Eradication of disease: Hype, hope and reality2017 John Middleton Secure, healthy, inclusive and green – four dividends of a healthier future''

Notes

External links
Royal College of Physicians, Milroy lecture page

British lecture series
Medical lecture series
Royal College of Physicians